Acacia Gardens is a suburb of Sydney, in the state of New South Wales, Australia, 40 kilometres north-west of the Sydney central business district, in the local government area of the City of Blacktown. Acacia Gardens is part of the Greater Western Sydney region.

History
Acacia Gardens was formerly a part of Quakers Hill. The name was chosen to reflect the rural quality of the suburb, with acacia trees being prevalent in the area. Many of the streets in the suburb are named after flowers. It was formally recognized as a suburb in 1996.

Demographics
The next most common countries of birth were India 11.7% and the Philippines 5.5%. 53.9% of people only spoke English at home. Other languages spoken at home included Punjabi 6.9%, Hindi 5.1% and Tagalog 3.3%. The most common responses for religious affiliation were Catholic 28.0%, No Religion 14.0%, Hinduism 11.6%, Anglican 10.5% and Sikhism 5.9%.

Education
Acacia Gardens has just one primary school, Quakers Hill East Public School. Quakers Hill East was founded in 1959 on Lalor Road, Quakers Hill. In 2002, the  school was moved to Acacia Gardens but the name remained unchanged. Nearby, there are two other public primary schools (Barnier and Hambledon). Government High schools in nearby suburbs include Quakers Hill High School, Wyndham College and Glenwood High School NSW. There are also nearby Catholic primary schools (Mary Immaculate and Blessed John XXIII Primary). Nearby Catholic high schools include St. John Paul II Catholic College (prev. Terra Sancta College) and St Mark's Catholic College.

Transport
Busways provides regular services to Blacktown, Castle Hill, Rouse Hill, Plumpton, St Marys and Macquarie Centre. The closest railway stations are located at Quakers Hill and Blacktown. Hillsbus provides services to Parramatta and Sydney CBD from neighbouring Stanhope Gardens.

The suburb is served by Wilson station on the North-West T-way.

References

Suburbs of Sydney
City of Blacktown